John Peacock (born 27 March 1956) is an English football manager and former professional player.

Career

Playing career
Born in Leeds, Peacock made 190 appearances in the Football League for Scunthorpe United, as a full back.

Coaching career
In 2010, he won the UEFA European Under-17 Championship as coach of the England under-17 national team. He won the competition again in 2014.

References

1956 births
Footballers from Leeds
Boston United F.C. players
Scunthorpe United F.C. players
English football managers
English footballers
English Football League players
Living people
Football managers from Leeds
Association football defenders
Derby County F.C. non-playing staff
Manchester United F.C. non-playing staff